The Teresva is a right tributary of the river Tisza in the Zakarpattia Oblast, western Ukraine. It rises in the Eastern Carpathians. It flows through the towns Ust-Chorna and Dubove, and it discharges into the Tisza near the town Teresva, on the border with Romania.

References

Rivers of Zakarpattia Oblast
Braided rivers in Ukraine